The apostilb is an obsolete unit of luminance. The SI unit of luminance is the candela per square metre (cd/m2). In 1942 Parry Moon proposed to rename the apostilb the blondel, after the French physicist André Blondel. The symbol for the apostilb is asb.

The apostilb is defined in terms of another unit of luminance, the stilb (sb):
1 asb = 1/ ⋅ 10−4 sb
 asb = 1 cd/m2

See also
Other units of luminance:

 Lambert (L)
 Skot (sk)
 Bril (bril)
 Nit (nit)
 Foot-lambert (fL)

References

Units of luminance
Centimetre–gram–second system of units